False Hope or False Hopes may refer to:

 "False Hope" (single), a 2013 single by Song Ji-eun
 False Hope (EP), a 2017 EP by Kevin Garrett
 False Hopes (Dessa album), 2005
 False Hopes (Doomtree album), 2007
 Cecil Otter's False Hopes, 2005